Roger White (born 31 August 1965) is an Australian luger. He competed in the men's singles event at the 1994 Winter Olympics.

References

External links
 

1965 births
Living people
Australian male lugers
Olympic lugers of Australia
Lugers at the 1994 Winter Olympics
Sportspeople from Wollongong